WDUN (550 kHz), known as "North Georgia's Newstalk", is a news/talk formatted AM radio station licensed to the city Gainesville, Georgia, in the Atlanta, Georgia radio market. WDUN is licensed as a Class B AM broadcast facility by the Federal Communications Commission operating with 10,000 watts of power during the daytime using a non-directional antenna signal pattern, and 2,500 watts during nighttime using a directional antenna pattern. The station is currently owned by JWJ Properties, Inc., doing business as Jacobs Media Corporation, which also operates WDUN-FM in Clarkesville, Georgia.

Programming
The radio station features locally originated shows like Mornings on Maine Street, The Martha Zoller Show and Newsroom as part of its weekday programming line up.  Nationally syndicated hosts include Mike Gallagher, Todd Starnes, Dave Ramsey, Ken Coleman, Ben Shapiro, Charlie Kirk,  Jim Bohannon, George Noory, John Trout and Leo Laporte.
WDUN's sports programming includes Atlanta Falcons football, and local prep play-by-play coverage covering a ten-county area. They also air all NASCAR Monster Energy Cup Series and Most NASCAR Xfinity Series Races from either Motor Racing Network or Performance Racing Network

History
About a year after World War II ended, The Atlanta Constitution newspaper was granted a construction permit to build a
station on the enviable 550 kHz spot. The paper erected a four -tower, in -line directional array off Defoors Ferry Road,
Fulton County, Georgia. WCON hit the southern airwaves in 1947 as a 5000-watt ABC affiliate. Its studios and ample staff
were located in the Constitution Building. The FCC suspected that the station's antenna pattern might not be as predictable
in practice as it was (in theory) on the application form. When the readings didn't look manageable, the Commission
backed away from fully licensing WCON beyond its initial construction permit and program test authorization. Whether the
station could have been fixed to the FCC's satisfaction became an academic question when, a year or so later,
the Constitution merged with rival The Atlanta Journal. Because (in those pre-duopoly days) the Journal already owned one
of the South's finest stations, 50,000-watt WSB 750, the resulting media company (Atlanta Newspapers, Inc.) was only
allowed one Atlanta-area AM, so it quickly took troubled WCON dark. Reportedly, much of the equipment was sold to another
then-fledgling Atlanta station, WQXI 790.

As part of the station's history, "WDUN 550" and sports formatted 1240 ESPN Radio (WGGA) swapped dial positions in the 1983.

References

External links
WDUN official website

DUN
Radio stations established in 1949
1949 establishments in Georgia (U.S. state)